1985 Emperor's Cup Final was the 65th final of the Emperor's Cup competition. The final was played at National Stadium in Tokyo on January 1, 1986. Nissan Motors won the championship.

Overview
Nissan Motors won their 2nd title, by defeating Fujita Industries 2–0.

Match details

See also
1985 Emperor's Cup

References

Emperor's Cup
1985 in Japanese football
Yokohama F. Marinos matches
Shonan Bellmare matches